Necropolis of Fossa was an Italic necropolis, the ruins of which are located in the comune of Fossa, in the province of L'Aquila in the Abruzzo region of Italy.

References

External links

Archaeological sites in Abruzzo
Fossa, Abruzzo